Die Presse is a German-language daily broadsheet newspaper based in Vienna, Austria. It is considered a newspaper of record for Austria.

History and profile
Die Presse was first printed on 3 July 1848 as a liberal (libertarian)-bourgeois newspaper within the meaning of the revolutions of 1848 by the entrepreneur August Zang. Its staff split in 1864 under the leadership of Max Friedländer, Michael Etienne and Adolf Werthner to form the Neue Freie Presse, which later was aryanized by the Nazis in 1938 and effectively closed in 1939. In 1946, after the Second World War, resistance fighter Ernst Molden, who had been vice-editor-in-chief of the Neue Freie Presse from 1921 until 1939, reestablished the newspaper as Die Presse.

The "Presse" had been struggling for financial survival for a long time, until during the 1960s, the Austrian Chamber of Commerce became the main shareholder. Since 1999 it has been owned by the Styria Medien AG, a conservative-liberal media group founded by the Catholic Church. Its publisher is Die Presse Verlag GmbH.

The paper covers general news topics. It is frequently quoted in international media concerning news from Austria. Since March 2009 it has also been operating a weekly newspaper under the name "Die Presse am Sonntag". The daily covers half-page science news each day.

The political position of the "Die Presse" can be described as classical liberal, with a strong emphasis on free-market economy and small government, traditionally opposing Austria's grand coalition and its neocorporatist tendencies. It therefore stands in contrast to other Austrian newspapers of quality including the more conservative Wiener Zeitung and the social-liberal Der Standard. Emphasis is put on the 1848 revolutions as the beginning of its tradition as a liberal newspaper, citing it in its slogan "Free since 1848". Despite its liberal free-market orientation, Karl Marx and Friedrich Engels wrote a series of articles on the American Civil War for Die Presse in the early 1860s, which were later collected into the book The Civil War in the United States.

In 2007 the editor-in-chief of Die Presse was Michael Fleischhacker who had been appointed to the post in 2004. Next year the paper was named Best Editorial Team in Austria.

Circulation
In 2002 Die Presse was one of four quality daily newspapers with nationwide distribution along with Der Standard, Salzburger Nachrichten, and Wiener Zeitung. The same year its circulation was 120,000 copies. In 2004 the paper had a circulation of 115,000 copies.

The 2007 circulation of Die Presse was 121,000 copies. The circulation of the daily was 120,363 copies in 2008 and 102,598 copies in 2009. It was 97,091 copies in 2010. The paper had a circulation of 74,032 copies in 2011. Its circulation was 80,000 copies in 2013.

CIA involvement
In 2009, reports claimed that the long-time editor Otto Schulmeister had been working for the CIA in the 1960s and the 1970s, and the CIA already described it internally as “CIA-subsidized” as early as 1951, when the CIA used it to distribute Animal Farm in the Soviet Zone of Vienna.

Notes

References

Further reading

External links
 
  

1946 establishments in Austria
German-language newspapers published in Austria
Newspapers published in Vienna
Daily newspapers published in Austria
Newspapers established in 1946
Austrian news websites